Lam Chi-chung (born 16 August 1976) is a Hong Kong actor.

Partial filmography
 The Sexy Guys (2019)
 The Incredible Monk 3 (2019)
 Monkey King - The Volcano (2019)
 Flirting Scholar from the Future (2019)
 A Home with a View (2019)
 She's a Man. He's a Woman (2019)
 Crazy Hammer (2018)
 A Bird Frightened of a Bow (2018)
 Kung Fu League (2018)
 Fake Partner (2018)
 Million Demons City (2018)
 The Incredible Monk (2018)
 Hello Miss Bai (2017)
 Graduation Journey (2017)
 Winning Buddha (2017)
 Kick Ball (2017)
 Funny Soccer (2016)
 The Mermaid (2016)
 The Eight Immortals in School (2016)
 iGirl (2016)
 House of Wolves (2016)
 Dot 2 Dot (2014)
 Flirting in the Air (2014)
 The Apostles (2014)
 Mortician (2013)
 A Style of Men in Beijing (2013)
 The Adventures of Jinbao (2012)
 Everything Is Nothing (2012)
 Ultra Reinforcement (2012)
 Marrying a Perfect Man (2012)
 Racer Legend (2011)
 Big Big Man (2011)
 Tiger Must Also Marry (2010)
 The Haunting Lover (2010)
 Once Upon a Chinese Classic (2010)
 Fortune King is Coming to Town! (2010)
 Flirting Scholar 2 (2010)
 On His Majesty's Secret Service (2009)
 Kung Fu Chefs (2009)
 The Luckiest Man (2008)
 Shaolin Girl (2008)
 CJ7 (2008)
 Dancing Lion (2007)
 Kung Fu Fighter (2007)
 My Kung-Fu Sweetheart (2006)
 Kung Fu Mahjong (2005)
 Kung Fu Hustle (2004) - Bone (Sing's Sidekick)
 Love Is a Many Stupid Thing (2004) - Fatty
 Cat and Mouse (2003)
 Women from Mars (2002)
 Beauty and the Breast (2002) - Choi
 Shaolin Soccer (2001) - Light Weight Vest
 I'll Call You -(2006) - director and screenwriter

References

External links
 

1976 births
Living people
Hong Kong male actors
TVB actors